Timmendorf is part of the municipality of Insel Poel on the Baltic Sea island of the same name in the district of Nordwestmecklenburg in the German state of Mecklenburg-Vorpommern. Timmendorf lies on the west coast of the island of Poel and is divided into the villages of Timmendorf and Timmendorf Strand, which are about a kilometre from one another. A prominent landmark in Timmendorf Strand and sea mark for the navigation of shipping in the Bay of Wismar is Timmendorf Lighthouse. A little to the north of the lighthouse there is a pilot's house with a tower. The settlement has a one-kilometre-long sandy beach and a small harbour in which sports boats, fishing vessels and a pilot boat are moored. The tourist infrastructure includes various holiday apartments, a large campsite and several restaurants. In summer the beach of Timmendorf Strand is packed with visiting bathers and the harbour of Timmendorf is full of yachts.

References

External links 

Villages in Mecklenburg-Western Pomerania
Nordwestmecklenburg